The 1941 Florida hurricane was a compact but strong tropical cyclone that affected the Bahamas, Florida, and the southeastern United States in October 1941. The fifth known storm of the 1941 Atlantic hurricane season, it was first observed to the north of the Virgin Islands on October 3. The storm tracked generally westward, reaching peak winds of  before passing through the Bahamas. The hurricane then emerged into the Gulf of Mexico as a tropical storm, but regained hurricane intensity and made another landfall along the Florida Panhandle. Turning northeast, it crossed Georgia and South Carolina, and entered the Atlantic Ocean on October 8.

In advance of the storm, preparations were extensive; residents boarded up homes and businesses, while evacuations were recommended in some coastal areas. In the Bahamas, where winds reached , the storm killed three people. The city of Nassau was struck particularly hard. In Florida, damage was relatively severe, and included the deaths of several people. High winds brought down trees and power lines, though the storm was characterized by highly unusual rainfall patterns. In the Everglades region, a storm surge flooded local streets. As the storm progressed northward, the city of Tallahassee suffered widespread power outages and damage to numerous vehicles. Throughout the state, the hurricane inflicted US$675,000 ($ 2011 USD) in damage. The cyclone later killed one person in Georgia.

Meteorological history

On October 3, the first indications of a tropical system were observed  to the north of the Virgin Islands. A tropical storm is estimated to have been present late that day, though observations were very sparse near the cyclone. The next day, morning observations confirmed the presence of a circulation center, and soon afterward the cyclone underwent rapid intensification: it became a hurricane late that day, and 24 hours later, on October 5, the storm reached a peak of —equivalent to a modern-day Category 3 hurricane on the Saffir-Simpson hurricane wind scale. Shortly afterward, the smaller-than-average, fast-moving cyclone tracked over Cat Island in the Bahamas, where a weather station indicated a pressure of  inside the eye. After striking Cat Island, the cyclone began a weakening trend and  passed south of New Providence, seat of the Bahamian capital Nassau, early on October 6. At the time, the storm was still found to be a compact, well-developed hurricane.

The storm contained peak winds of —equivalent to low-end Category 2 status—and a radius of maximum wind just  from the center. Maintaining a small size, the hurricane moved through the Everglades, passing between Everglades City and Fort Myers. The storm entered the Gulf of Mexico as a strong tropical storm and broadly curved toward the northwest, tracking offshore along the west coast of Florida. The cyclone still exhibited a small radius of outermost closed isobar but had reduced its forward speed.

Turning north and then northeast, the storm moved beyond Tallahassee and entered Georgia. The cyclone kept its intensity for two more days as it moved toward the southeast, executed a small loop, and turned generally toward the east-northeast, passing south of Bermuda on the night of October 11. The storm became extratropical on October 12, fully dissipating the next day.

Preparations

During the days before the storm's arrival in Florida, the Weather Bureau issued 40 tropical cyclone-related advisories. Extensive preparations that resulted in a low loss of life and property were attributed to the warnings. In southern Florida, residents boarded up homes and businesses, and sought shelter in large structures. Hurricane parties took place in bars and hotel rooms, while some residents sat in hotel lobbies, listening to radio broadcasts. In Miami, stores sold out of various essentials—including bread and butter—as people prepared for the storm.
Evacuations were recommended from Homestead to Key West, and three Coast Guard planes dropped warnings to boats near the Florida coast. The Civilian Conservation Corps also evacuated 150 of its workers from West Summerland Key to Key West.

Local chapters of the American Red Cross organized first-aid stations and shelters; transportation was provided to those who were unable to reach the shelters. In advance of the storm, Pan American World Airways suspended flights departing from and arriving at Miami and redirected them to Havana, Cuba. The United States Navy also prepared its bases in the Florida Keys for the arrival of the storm by securing boats to piers and canceling all shore leaves, while the United States Army Air Corps moved its planes from Morrison Field to a safer location inland. The state of Florida stockpiled food for those affected by the storm, establishing depots in West Palm Beach, Miami, and Fort Myers, and the Governor of Florida, Spessard Holland, ordered state agencies to prepare for relief work. A detachment of officers from the Florida Highway Patrol was sent to Miami and patrolled along highways to provide gasoline to motorists evacuating the storm. The state also opened all of the school buildings in Dade County as emergency shelters.

Impact

Bahamas
In the Bahamas, where considerable property damage was reported, the storm killed three people. Winds in Nassau reached . City streets were filled with debris, including a schooner, four sloops, and numerous other boats deposited by the winds on Nassau's Bay Street. The winds knocked down trees and power lines, resulting in fires and extensive power outages. Along the coast, boats were ripped from their moorings and smashed against seawalls. No casualties occurred in the city. A schooner, the Goodwill II, sank during the storm. Properties and gardens received significant damage. On Cat Island, the storm produced  of rainfall.

Two men, Christopher Whymss and Salathiel Johnson, drowned near Andros Island after trying to reach shore from a drowning schooner. One man, Samuel Seymour, was killed on Cat Island after his home was toppled by the wind, and several other injuries were reported on the island. "Most homes, all churches, and most public buildings" on Cat Island were also destroyed by the storm. The storm also downed telephone lines and destroyed crops. As a result, the Duke of Windsor, governor-general of the Bahamas, cabled to the Red Cross for assistance, and a ship carrying "food, clothing, building materials and seeds" was quickly dispatched to Cat Island. According to a survey conducted a few days after the hurricane, 300 families on Cat Island were left homeless as were 120 families on Watlings Island. To aid these families, the Duke of Windsor announced on October 7 that he would establish a relief fund for those affected by the storm.

United States

On making landfall, the storm generated high winds at the Fowey Rocks Light, although they were below hurricane force. The light rainfall was evident throughout southeastern Florida, except for the Florida Keys, where thunderstorms enhanced the precipitation. This aspect of the storm was considered highly unusual, as most tropical cyclones are characterized by heavy rainfall. According to one study, the unusual precipitation patterns can be attributed to one of two possible conditions: "the air might have been too dry", or "the horizontal convergence of air might have been insufficient to produce a large enough transport of moisture upwards". The intense winds blew salt water several miles inland; due to the lack of rainfall, the salt burned vegetation throughout the region. The high winds brought down trees and utility poles and shattered some windows in Dade County.

No deaths were reported in the region, although minor damage was inflicted on communication lines and homes and several injuries were reported. Several communities lost electricity. Some hospitals were left without power, forcing the delivery of six babies by candlelight. The storm injured seven people in the Miami area, including five firefighters who were injured "as they fought a blaze fanned by the high winds" of the hurricane. Storm surge in the region triggered foot-deep flooding of some streets in local towns. Docks and fishing equipment suffered extensive damage in the region. As the hurricane passed offshore, winds reached  near Tampa Bay. The storm also grounded a fishing schooner from Cuba off the coast of Collier County, Florida. Although no one was injured, members of the schooner crew were detained by immigration authorities.

After emerging into the Gulf of Mexico, the hurricane made another landfall at Carrabelle on the Florida Panhandle. In Tallahassee, the winds downed trees and power lines and scattered debris, rendering roads impassable. The Tallahassee Democrat reported that "at the height of the wind several hundred Tallahasseeans were seen rushing into their yard to gather pecans which were knocked down by the swaying trees". The storm destroyed vehicles throughout the region; replacement automobiles were sparse, as assembly plants were producing cars for the Army. Despite a lack of electricity due to the winds, the Tallahassee Democrat managed to publish 6,000 copies of a special storm edition. Initial fears of severe damage along the coast prompted rescue crews to push toward St. Marks; however, upon arrival a group of local residents convinced the crew that their assistance was unnecessary. Considerable crop and property damage was reported; total losses in the state were estimated at US$675,000 ($ in today's terms). Seven injuries were reported, and five men drowned in the storm tide at a fishing net drying yard in Panacea, Florida. Initially, there were reports of 20 missing fishermen. 34 Cuban fishermen were also trapped off the coast near Carrabelle when 10 boats ran aground and were damaged after the storm surge subsided. The fishermen's supply of food was destroyed by salt water, but they were rescued by the Coast Guard cutter Nemesis without any injuries. After their rescue, they reported that five men had drowned in a small boat nearby.

The storm was still producing high wind gusts as it tracked into Georgia, killing one person and leaving a trail of considerable damage as far north as Albany. The single death in Georgia was a 16-year-old girl, Frances Hester, of Pavo, Georgia, who died after tripping over an electrical wire downed by the storm. The storm passed through South Carolina with little damage. Throughout parts of the southeastern United States, rainfall associated with the hurricane was unusually light and unevenly distributed along its track.

See also

 List of Florida hurricanes
 List of United States hurricanes

Notes

References

Further reading
 
 

Florida Hurricane, 1941
Category 3 Atlantic hurricanes
Hurricanes in Florida
Hurricanes in Georgia (U.S. state)
Hurricanes in South Carolina
1941 in Florida
1941 natural disasters in the United States
1941 meteorology